The 1988 Copa Interamericana was the 11th staging of this competition. The final took place between Nacional (winners of the 1988 Copa Libertadores) and Olimpia (2inners of the 1988 CONCACAF Champions' Cup) and was staged over two legs on 5 and 29 March 1989.

After the first leg in Tegucigalpa ended 1–1, Nacional easily defeated Olimpia 4–0 in Montevideo to win their second Copa Interamericana. With this achievement, the Uruguayan side won their fourth international trophy within five months so they had previously won the Copa Libertadores, Copa Intercontinental and Recopa.

Qualified teams

Venues

Match details

First Leg

Second Leg

|}

References 

Copa Interamericana
i
i
i